Clifden, New Zealand is a small rural community on the Waiau River, Southland, New Zealand. It is notable for being the site of the Clifden Suspension Bridge (a government Category I historic site) and the Clifden Limestone Caves, well-known since early European settlers made it a "must see" place to visit.

History

Clifden war memorial

It contains the names of local soldiers who fought and died in World War I.

References

External links
 Clifden Bridge
 Clifden Caves Department of Conservation
 Clifden war memorial NZ History

Populated places in Southland, New Zealand